"The Culling" is a 2012 DC Comic crossover story arc in their relaunched The New 52. It involves three titles:  Teen Titans, Legion Lost and Superboy, which is the conclusion to story arcs in all three titles involving the villainous organization N.O.W.H.E.R.E.  It begins in Teen Titans Annual #1, and runs through the ninth issues of each of the three series. In its wake, a new series titled The Ravagers was launched.

Titles involved

Reception

Collected editions
The Culling: Rise of the Ravagers (Legion Lost #8–9, Superboy #8–9, Teen Titans #8–9 and Teen Titans Annual #1)
Teen Titans Vol. 2: The Culling (Teen Titans #8–14 and DC Universe Presents #12)
Superboy Vol. 2: Extraction (Superboy #0 & #8–12 and Teen Titans #10)
Legion Lost Vol 2: The Culling ( Legion Lost #0 & #8–16)

DC Comics titles